Gene Thomas is an American football player.

Gene Thomas may also refer to:

Gene Thomas (murder victim)
Gene Thomas (musician), American country musician

See also
Jean Thomas (disambiguation)
Eugene Thomas (disambiguation)